Einstein Gravity in a Nutshell is a textbook by Anthony Zee.

Response 
Michael Berg said in a review in the Mathematical Association of America, "I must admit that, as its nutshell predecessor, Einstein Gravity in a Nutshell is very appealing to me, and I am certainly won over by Zee’s chatty but on-the-money style". Luboš Motl said about the book on his blog The Reference Frame: "Anthony is more playful and less formal but there are aspects in which he gets further than any other introductory textbook of GR. The book is full of notes, a long index, and simply clever exercises. The illustrations are pretty and professional [...] I recommend you once again to try the book". Pedro G. Ferreira, professor at the University of Oxford called it "a remarkably complete and thorough textbook on general relativity, written in a refreshing and engaging style. Zee leads us through all the major intellectual steps that make what is surely one of the most profound and beautiful theories of all time. The book is enjoyable and informative in equal measure. Quite an achievement."

References

See also 

 Carroll, Sean M. Spacetime and Geometry : An Introduction to General Relativity. Addison Wesley, 2004. .
 Wheeler, John; Misner, Charles W; Thorne, Kip. Gravitation. W.H. Freeman and Company, 1973. .
 Wald, Robert M. General Relativity. University of Chicago Press, 1984. .

Physics textbooks
General relativity